The Wannon River, a perennial river of the Glenelg Hopkins catchment, is located in the Western District of Victoria, Australia.

Name
The name of the river "is believed to have been obtained by Major Mitchell from the local Jardwadjali people".

Location and features
The Wannon River rises below Mount William, part of the Grampians Range in the Grampians National Park. The river flows generally south, initially towards , and then north by west and then west, through the town of  before heading south to the settlement of Wannon. From here the river flows west towards  where it reaches its confluence with the Glenelg River. The Wannon is joined by twelve tributaries including the Dundas River. The river descends  over its  course.

The Henty Brothers found that the river played a significant role in the early settlement of the area surrounding the Wannon River. Also of note was the situation of the Mokanger Station, in Cavendish, purchased by Thomas and Andrew Chirnside in 1842.

The main land use along the river is production of sheep for wool. Other land uses include production of sheep for prime lambs and cattle for beef.

These tourist attractions have facilities for visitors. During the 1880s, impressionist painter Louis Buvelot painted many scenes around the falls and the river.

The Division of Wannon, an Australian Electoral Division, is named after the river. The Division was held from 1955 until 1983 by former Prime Minister Malcolm Fraser.

References

External links

 Google Street View - The river at Wannon from the bridge on the Glenelg Highway

Glenelg Hopkins catchment
Rivers of Barwon South West (region)
Rivers of Grampians (region)
Western District (Victoria)